Cachaço is a settlement in the northwestern part of the island of São Nicolau, Cape Verde. It is situated 3 km southwest of Fajã de Baixo and 5 km west of Ribeira Brava. It lies on the national road from Tarrafal de São Nicolau to Ribeira Brava (EN1-SN01). Cachaço lies at about 700 m elevation, at the northeastern foot of Monte Gordo, and partly within the Monte Gordo Natural Park. Several rivers have their source near Cachaço, including the north-flowing Ribeira Grande and the east-flowing Ribeira Brava.

See also
List of villages and settlements in Cape Verde

References

Villages and settlements in São Nicolau, Cape Verde
Ribeira Brava, Cape Verde